Thomas Nelson (January 23, 1819 – July 25, 1907) was an American attorney and judge. He was appointed as the 2nd Chief Justice of the Oregon Supreme Court serving from 1850 to 1853. A native of the U.S. state of New York, he lived in Oregon only during his term as chief justice.

Early life
Nelson was born January 23, 1819, in Peekskill, New York. There he passed the bar and received his license to practice law in 1840.

Legal career
In 1850 U.S. President Millard Fillmore appointed Nelson to the territorial supreme court of Oregon to replace William P. Bryant. Nelson arrived at Oregon City in April 1850. He served until 1853 when his term ended. During this same time he served as chief justice of the court, and then left Oregon in August 1853 to return to New York. There he practiced law until he died in New York on July 25, 1907, at the age of 88.

External links
A Peculiar Paradise
Stealing the Capital

References

1819 births
1907 deaths
People from Peekskill, New York
Oregon Territory judges
19th-century American judges
Chief Justices of the Oregon Supreme Court
Justices of the Oregon Supreme Court